In common usage, a scoop is any specialized spoon used to serve food.

In the technical terms used by the food service industry and in the retail and wholesale food utensil industries, there is a clear distinction between three types of scoop: the disher, which is used to measure a portion e.g. cookie dough, to make melon balls, and often to serve ice cream (although manufacturers frequently advise against using dishers for ice cream and other frozen foods); ice cream scoops, and the scoop which is used to measure or to transfer an unspecified amount of a bulk dry foodstuff such as rice, flour, or sugar.

Disher 
Dishers are usually hemispherical like an ice cream scoop, while measuring scoops are usually cylindrical, and transfer scoops are usually shovel-shaped. Some dishers have mechanical levers which help expel the disher's contents. Traditionally dishers are sized by the number of scoops per quart but may also be sized by ounces, the diameter of the bowl, or the number of tablespoons they hold.

Ice cream scoop 
Some higher-end ice cream scoops have a thermally conductive liquid in the handle to help keep the ice cream from freezing to the scoop's metal.

History 

Alfred L. Cralle, a porter in a drug store and at a hotel in Pittsburgh, Pennsylvania, noticed that servers at the hotel had trouble with ice cream sticking to serving spoons, and he developed an ice cream scoop. On June 10 1896, Cralle applied for a patent on his invention. He was awarded patent 576,395 on 2 February 1897. The patented "Ice Cream Mold and Disher," was an ice cream scoop with a built-in scraper to allow for one-handed operation. Cralle's functional design is reflected in modern ice cream scoops.

Transfer scoop 
Transfer scoops (a.k.a. utility scoops) are used to transfer bulk foods from large storage containers to smaller containers, and generally do not have any measurement markings, as their purpose is to transfer, and taking time to adjust the amount in a scoop would slow the transfer rate.

Other types

 Ice scoop
 Coffee scoop
 Spooner
 Dipper
 French fry scoop

Standard sizes 
The table below is the standard definition in the U.S. food industry, but actual capacity varies by manufacturer.

See also
Ladle

References

Spoons
American inventions
Serving utensils
Customary units of measurement in the United States